The RSA Conference (RSAC) Award for Excellence in Mathematics is an annual award. It is announced at the annual RSA Conference in recognition of innovations and contributions in the field of cryptography. An award committee of experts, which is associated with the Cryptographer's Track committee at the RSA Conference (CT-RSA),  nominates to the award persons who are pioneers in their field, and whose work has had applied or theoretical lasting value; the award is typically given for the lifetime achievements throughout the nominee's entire career.   Nominees are often affiliated with universities or involved with research and development in the information technology industry. The award is cosponsored by the International Association for Cryptologic Research.

While the field of modern cryptography started to be an active research area in the 1970s, it has already contributed heavily to Information technology and has served as a critical component in advancing the world of computing: the Internet, Cellular networks, and Cloud computing, Information privacy, Privacy engineering, Anonymity, Storage security, and Information security, to mention just a few sectors and areas. Research in Cryptography as a scientific field involves the disciplines of Mathematics, Computer Science, and Engineering. The award, which started in 1998, is one of the few recognitions fully dedicated to acknowledging experts who have advanced the field of cryptography and its related areas (another such recognition is achieving the rank of an IACR Fellow).

The first recipient of the award in 1998 was Shafi Goldwasser. Also, many of the award winners have gotten other recognitions, such as other prestigious awards, and the rank of fellow in various professional societies, etc.

Research in Cryptography is broad and is dedicated to numerous areas. In fact, the award has, over the years, emphasized the methodological contributions to the field which involve mathematical research in various ways, and has recognized achievements in many of the following crucial areas of research: 
 Some areas are in the general Computational number theory and Computational algebra fields, or in the fields of Information theory and Computational complexity theory, where proper mathematical structures are constructed or investigated as underlying mathematics to be employed in the field of cryptography; 
 Some areas are  theoretical in nature, where new notions for Cryptographic primitives are defined and their security is carefully formalized as foundations of the field, some work is influenced by Quantum computing as well; 
 Some areas are dedicated to designing new or improved primitives from concrete or abstract mathematical mechanisms for Symmetric-key cryptography, Public-key cryptography, and Cryptographic protocols (such as Zero-knowledge proofs, Secure multi-party computations, or Threshold cryptosystems); 
 Some other areas are dedicated to Cryptanalysis: the breaking of cryptographic systems and mechanisms; 
 Yet some other areas are dedicated to the actual practice of cryptography and its efficient cryptographic hardware and software implementations, to developing and deploying new actual protocols (such as the Transport Layer Security and IPsec) to be used by information technology applications and systems. Also included are research areas where principles and basic methods are developed for achieving security and privacy in computing and communication systems.

To further read on various aspects of cryptography, from history to areas of modern research, see Books on cryptography.

It is worth noting that in addition to the Award for Excellence in Mathematics which recognizes lifetime achievement in the specific area of Cryptographic research, the RSA conference has also presented a separate lifetime achievement awards in the more general field of information security. Past recipients of this award from the field of cryptography include: 
 Taher Elgamal (2009),
 Whitfield Diffie (2010), 
 Ronald Rivest, Adi Shamir, and Leonard Adleman (2011), and 
 Martin Hellman (2012)

Past recipients

See also 

 List of computer science awards
 List of mathematics awards

Notes
Here are a few examples of videos from the award ceremonies and interviews with award winners; these give some more information about each specific award year, and demonstrate the breadth of research behind each such an award:
 2009 Interview with V. Miller 
 2009 Interview with N. Koblitz 
 2013 Award ceremony: J.-J. Quisquater and C. P. Schnorr:
 2014 Award ceremony: B. Preneel:
 2015 Award ceremony: I.B. Damgård and H. Krawczyk 
 2016 Award ceremony: U. Maurer 
 2019 Award ceremony video: T. Rabin, and the Cryptographer's panel.
 2020 Award ceremony video: J. Daemen and V. Rijmen.
 2021 Award ceremony video: D. Pointcheval

References

Mathematics awards
Computer science awards
Cryptography